The following lists events that happened during 1879 in New Zealand.

Incumbents

Regal and viceregal
Head of State – Queen Victoria
Governor – The term of The Marquess of Normanby ends on 21 February. Sir Hercules Robinson takes up the appointment on 27 March.

Government and law
The general election is held between 15 August and 1 September; a law was passed to confirm the result in three electorates (and ); and to clarify the law about electoral petitions (1880). The 7th New Zealand Parliament commences.

Speaker of the House – Maurice O'Rorke becomes Speaker when his predecessor, Sir William Fitzherbert, is appointed to the Legislative Council.
Premier – John Hall replaces Sir George Grey on 8 October.
Minister of Finance – John Hall replaces Sir George Grey on 8 October. Grey had taken up the post on 10 July after John Ballance had resigned on 1 July.
Chief Justice – Hon Sir James Prendergast

Voting rights are extended to all males.

The term of parliament is reduced from five years to three years.

Main centre leaders
Mayor of Auckland – Thomas Peacock
Mayor of Christchurch – Henry Thomson followed by Charles Thomas Ick
Mayor of Dunedin – Henry John Walter
Mayor of Wellington – Joseph Dransfield followed by George Allen followed by William Hutchison

Events 
 21 February: An explosion in the coal mine at Kaitangata kills 34 men.
 30 March: The Ross Guardian ceases publication. It began in 1866.
 Education (secular or denominational) was being debated. In two by-elections the winner was described as a Secularist: David Goldie in the 1879 City of Auckland West by-election and Acton Adams in the 1879 City of Nelson by-election. They opposed Curtis's bill before parliament.

Sport

Chess
 The first New Zealand Chess Championship is held and was won by H. Hookham (Christchurch)

Horse racing

Major race winners
New Zealand Cup – Chancellor
New Zealand Derby – Hornby
Auckland Cup – Ariel
Wellington Cup – Maritana

Lawn bowls
The first annual competition between clubs from different centres begins between Christchurch and Dunedin clubs.

Rugby union
26 July: The first union in New Zealand, Canterbury Rugby Football Union, is formed at Timaru, incorporating Christchurch, Christ's College, Temuka, North Canterbury, Eastern, South Canterbury, Ashburton, and Southbridge rugby clubs.
20 October: The Wellington Rugby Football Union is formed, initially consisting of the Wellington and Athletic clubs.

Shooting
Ballinger Belt – Corporal W. Ballinger (Wellington)

Births
 18 January: Agnes Weston, politician (MLC).
 25 May: Andrew Kennaway Henderson, illustrator, cartoonist and pacifist
 30 August (in London): Maud Ruby "Daisy" Basham, radio personality.
 15 June: Miriam Cummings (later Miriam Soljak), activist.
 28 December: Claude Weston, politician.

Deaths
 2 February (in England): General Sir Thomas Pratt, commander British forces in NZ 1860–61.
 3 March: Jerningham Wakefield, politician and pioneer settler.
 24 April – John Munro, politician (b. 1798/99)
 14 May: Henry Sewell, politician. 
 14 July: Thomas Outhwaite, first registrar of the Supreme Court.

See also
List of years in New Zealand
Timeline of New Zealand history
History of New Zealand
Military history of New Zealand
Timeline of the New Zealand environment
Timeline of New Zealand's links with Antarctica

References
General
 Romanos, J. (2001) New Zealand Sporting Records and Lists. Auckland: Hodder Moa Beckett. 
Specific

External links